On 27 April 1974, an Aeroflot Il-18 airliner crashed while operating a charter flight from Leningrad (now St. Petersburg) to Zaporizhzhia, continuing to Krasnodar, Russia. The plane crashed shortly after takeoff from Pulkovo Airport in Leningrad. None of the 109 people on board survived. An engine fire had been caused by a faulty compressor disk.

Aircraft
The aircraft had been in service since 1964, and had sustained 7,501 cycles (takeoffs and landings) at the time of the crash.

Passengers and crew
The flight was led by Captain Nikolai Danilov, with 4 other pilots and two flight attendants. There were 102 passengers on board.

Accident
The aircraft's number four engine caught fire two minutes after takeoff due to a faulty compressor disk. The crew elected to return to the airport. Upon extending the flaps for landing, an asymmetrical flap condition occurred, causing the aircraft to dive sharply about two and a half kilometers from the runway.

Strong vibrations in the number four engine had been reported on the flight before the crash.

See also
United Airlines Flight 232

References

Aviation accidents and incidents in 1974
Aeroflot
Aviation accidents and incidents in the Soviet Union
Accidents and incidents involving the Ilyushin Il-18
1974 in the Soviet Union
Airliner accidents and incidents involving uncontained engine failure